Jessica Carol Moore (born May 22, 1982) is an American journalist who currently works for WCBS-TV in New York City.

Awards and nominations
 2010, won Ohio Valley Regional Emmy Award for WLEX-TV
 2011, won KAPB Award for WLEX-TV
 2013, won The Best of Silver State Awards for KSNV-DT (now KSNV) along with KVVU-TV Anchor and Reporter John Huck
 2014, nominated 3 Pacific Southwest Regional Emmy Awards for KSNV-DT (now KSNV)
 2015, nominated Pacific Southwest Regional Emmy Award for KSNV-DT (now KSNV)
 2016, won Pacific Southwest Regional Emmy Award for KSNV

References

External links
 

1982 births
Living people
American television reporters and correspondents
American women television journalists
Journalists from Kentucky
Journalists from Ohio
Journalists from Las Vegas
Journalists from New York City
Journalists from North Carolina
Kentucky women news anchors
Kentucky women writers
Liberty University alumni
Nevada Independents
Nevada Republicans
New York (state) Independents
New York (state) Republicans
Television anchors from Las Vegas
Television anchors from New York City
Regional Emmy Award winners